Beautiful Illusions (镜中人) is a Singaporean TV series which aired in 2005. It stars Fann Wong in two diverse roles - a quiet and nondescript cartoon illustrator with a quirky sense of style (Yixin), and a stylish, vampy air stewardess who lives the high life on her motorbike (Joe Ann). The series title literally means "person in the mirror" and alludes to the main character

Story
A young Yixin (Fann Wong) watches her father get stabbed to death in a park by a teen delinquent Jiansheng (Thomas Ong) who is later sentenced to 17 years in jail. Psychologically scarred by the memory of her father's death, Yixin grows up bitter and vengeful, even though she appears docile and sweet outwardly. When Jiansheng is released, she discovers that he is in fact the son of a wealthy family, and embarks on a mission to sow discord between him and his family.

Little does she realise that Jiansheng comes from a troubled background. He and his brother Jianwei lived in fear of their alcoholic and violent father. One day, their mother, Esther, decides to escape with the children but unfortunately leaves Jiansheng behind. Later, Esther remarries and leaves for America with Jianwei. Thinking that she has abandoned him, Jiansheng develops a hatred for his mother.

Meanwhile, Jianwei grew up and became a playboy. He returns to Singapore, where he meets the cool and mysterious Joe Ann. Jiansheng meets Yixin and love blossoms between them. They try to get their girlfriends to meet other but always in vain. Before long, the brothers realise that Yixin and Joe Ann look alike. Was this a case of an 'evil twin' or could they be the same person?

Production notes
 Fann Wong was nominated for Best Actress at the Singapore Star Awards 2005 for this role.
 Fann Wong performed the theme song of this serial, which was also nominated for Best Theme Song at the Singapore Star Awards 2005.
 This serial was nominated for Best Serial in the same awards ceremony.

Awards

Cast 
 Fann Wong - Wang Yixin, Joe Ann 
 Thomas Ong - Zhou Jiansheng
 Qi Yuwu - Zhou Jianwei
 Yvonne Lim - Lu Xiaofen
 Lin Liyun - Esther Wong 
 Jimmy Nah - Bai Cai (Cabbage)
 Nick Shen
 Joey Ng
 Yan Bingliang

External links 

Beautiful Illusions (English) on Mediacorp website
Beautiful Illusions (Chinese) on Mediacorp website

Singapore Chinese dramas
2005 Singaporean television series debuts
2005 Singaporean television series endings
Channel 8 (Singapore) original programming